3' Gauge rail modelling is a specialisation in rail transport modelling. Specifically it relates to the modelling of narrow gauge prototypes of  gauge. This gauge was the most common narrow gauge in the United States and in Ireland. Apart from some other lines in North, Central and South America,  gauge was uncommon elsewhere. Therefore, most 3' gauge modellers model either United States or Irish prototypes.

United States 

 gauge railroads were widespread in the United States in the period 1880-90. While most of these railroads were converted to standard gauge by the start of the 20th century, a number of lines survived till the Second World War and later, and became popular subjects for modelling.

Probably the most popular prototype is the Denver and Rio Grande Western Railroad, followed by other Colorado railroads such as the Rio Grande Southern and Colorado and Southern. Other railroads from California and the eastern states are also popular.

Scale and gauge combinations used in modelling include:

 Nn3 – Using N scale (1:160 ratio) with Z gauge track. 
 HOn3 – Using HO scale (1:87 ratio) with  gauge track. Historically the most popular of the scale/gauge combinations.
 Sn3 – Using S scale (1:64 ratio) with  gauge track. Limited commercial support.
 On3 – Using O scale (1:48 ratio) with  gauge track. Probably the second most popular  scale.
 F scale – using 1:20.3 ratio with  gauge track. This scale uses the same gauge as, and is derived from the popular G scale. It is the largest popular scale/gauge combination, and is suitable for use in the garden.

Perhaps not surprisingly, most narrow gauge modellers in the United States model US  gauge prototypes. However these prototypes are also popular modelling subjects outside the United States as well.

Ireland, the Isle of Man, and Britain 

 gauge was the narrow gauge used in Ireland, and the gauge of almost all the railways on the Isle of Man. It was also used on a handful of railways in Britain. However modelling these  gauge railways is very much a minority pursuit, especially when compared with other prototypes such as the Welsh  narrow gauge. Scales and gauges used include:

Generally these scale/gauge combinations do not have much commercial support, and therefore modellers are required to construct most of their models from scratch. 
00n3 is the exception and there is good support from manufacturers like Branchlines (Isle of Man Railway and some Irish lines), Worsley Works (mostly Irish railway 'scratch aid' brass kits) and Alphagraphix (mostly card Irish rolling stock kits). Some model kits are not available new due to production having ceased but can be found on the preowned market including the Backwoods models of Irish narrow gauge locomotives and rolling stock. Further information on 00n3 suppliers is given on the 00n3 entry.

See also
Model Railway Scales
Sn3½ – scale for modelling 3'6" (1067mm) gauge railways.
 List of narrow-gauge model railway scales
Rail transport modelling scales
Three foot gauge railways

External links
 Lex Parker's On3 model of the D&RGW
 Another On3 layout - the Paisley Mill & Timber Co.
  Slim Gauge Guild HOn3 and Sn3 layouts
 Nn3 Home Page
 Chester Model Railway Club Irish prototype layouts in OOn3
 15mm to the foot scale garden railway based on an Irish 3' gauge railway

Modelling 3' Gauge Railroads
Model railroad scales
Narrow gauge railway modelling